The Wright XF3W was an American racing aircraft built by Wright Aeronautical for the United States Navy.

Development and design
After the U.S. Navy declared its preference for radial engines, Wright developed the P-1 Simoon. To demonstrate the engine, the F3W was designed to carry it. The F3W was a single-seat biplane, with a steel tubing fuselage and wood wings, covered by fabric. Designed to be a carrier-based fighter and powered by the Simoon engine, its performance was poor. After the Navy took delivery of the aircraft, they installed a rival company's engine, the Pratt & Whitney R-1340 radial. The aircraft was redesignated XF3W, and flew with the new engine for the first time on 5 May 1926.

Operational history
The Navy used the XF3W as a test bed for the Pratt & Whitney engine until 1930, during which time the aircraft set a number of records. The XF3W was also fitted with a single centreline float to evaluate the concept of basing floatplanes on battleships.

Specifications

References

External links

1920s United States fighter aircraft
XF3W
Biplanes
Aircraft first flown in 1926
Single-engined tractor aircraft